Qudus Olamilekan Akanni (born 2 November 2000) is a Nigerian professional footballer who plays for Remo Stars F.C., in the Nigerian Professional Football League.>

Club career 
Bello made his professional debut for Remo Stars F.C. on in 2022. He was among the Nigerian team that was called up for the friendly game of the Nigerian Super Eagles against Costa Rica in San Jose.

Qudus was also part of the Remo Stars Team that made its historic debut in the CAF tournament in 2022.

References 

2000 births
Living people
Nigerian footballers
Association football midfielders
Remo Stars F.C. players
Nigeria Professional Football League players